Paanai Pidithaval Bhaagyasaali is a 1958 Indian Tamil-language comedy film produced and directed by T. S. Durairaj, starring himself, Savitri, K. Balaji, T. P. Muthulakshmi, P. S. Veerappa and V. S. Raghavan. It was released on 10 January 1958.

Plot 

There is an illiterate and orphaned woman (Savitri) who was raised by her brother (Durairaj). She witnesses a thief (R. Nageswara Rao) raiding a wealthy man's house and committing two murders. He is after her. Savithri goes through numerous adventures involving various men but manages  to escape all of them. She later meets a wealthy young man (Balaji) and falls in love with him. After many other incidents, she walks in helped by Durairaj and marries her lover who was originally set to marry another girl against his will.

Cast 
Credits adapted from The Hindu:
 T. S. Durairaj
 Savitri
 K. Balaji
 P. S. Veerappa
 V. S. Raghavan
 R. Nageswara Rao
 T. P. Muthulakshmi
 Saayiram
 Angamuthu
 T. N. Kamalam

Production 
Paanai Pidithaval Bhaagyasaali was produced and directed by T. S. Durairaj via his studio Marakatha Pictures, and he also starred as the male lead. Gangeyan was the writer. Shooting took place at many Madras studios such as Paramount, Revathi, Gemini and Majestic.

Soundtrack 
The music of the film was composed by S. V. Venkatraman and S. Rajeswara Rao, with lyrics by Mahakavi Subramanya Bharathiyar, T. K. Sundara Vathiyar and Thanjai N. Ramaiah Dass. The song "Purushan Veetil Vaazha Pora Penney" performed by Loganathan was criticised by social activists and critics for its misogynistic nature.

Reception 
Paanai Pidithaval Bhaagyasaali was released on 10 January 1958. The Indian Express said, "In [Paanai Pidithaval Bhaagyasaali], comedian Durairaj promotes himself to a producer and a competent director. The picture designed with economy of language, quickness of action and deftness of movement, makes an impression because of the skillfully woven plot, pleasing songs and lively antics." The Hindu wrote, "Good acting combined with pleasing and dance highlight Marakatha Pictures [Paanai Pidithaval Bhaagyasaali]. [Savitri] turns in a fine performance, so does [T. S. Durairaj]." According to historian Randor Guy, the film was not successful because of the "weak" screenplay and on-screen narration, but the music was its "redeeming feature".

References

External links 
 

1950s Tamil-language films
1958 comedy films
1958 directorial debut films
1958 films
Films scored by S. Rajeswara Rao
Films scored by S. V. Venkatraman
Indian comedy films